Dev Benegal is an Indian filmmaker and screenwriter, most known for his debut film English, August (1994), which won the Best Feature Film in English at the 42nd National Film Awards.

Early life and education
Dev was born in New Delhi to Som Benegal, a theatre director, and his wife Suman.

Dev Benegal grew up in New Delhi. In 1979, he left Delhi for Mumbai (then Bombay), to pursue a career in movies. He won an Asian Cultural Council grant in Film, Video & Photography to study Film History in the Cinema Studies Program at New York University from 1989–90.

Career

Early career

He began his career with legendary animator Ram Mohan and got his first job with Shashi Kapoor's Filmvalas. After assisting Shyam Benegal in films like Kalyug (1980), Mandi (1983) and his famous documentary on Satyajit Ray—Satyajit Ray, Filmmaker (1984)—Dev Benegal directed a series of short short films, Kalpavriksha: The Tree of Life (1988), Kanakambaram: Cloth: of Gold (1987), and Anantarupam: The Infinite Forms (1987). He directed several documentaries, including Shabana! (2003) with Indian film star Shabana Azmi and Abhivardhan: Building for a New Life (1992).

Debut Feature Film and India's National Film Award

In 1994 he wrote and directed his adaptation of Upamanyu Chatterjee's 1989 novel by the same name, based on the Indian Administrative Service, English, August (1994). The film received praise from critics for its modern and urban themes and was hailed as the cinematic counterpart to the later Anglo-Indian literary movement. It also won the Best Feature Film in English Award at National Film Awards, and is now hailed as a landmark in contemporary Indian cinema as it ushered in a wave of independent Indian filmmakers, commonly known as "multiplex films" in India.

The New York Times wrote: In "English, August", his first feature film, Mr. Benegal deftly manages the feat of using the scalpel of humor to lay bare a young man's painful but edifying immersion in an alien culture within his own land and to deliver potent sociological and political messages. Irreverent humor, frustrated idealism and earnest compassion are blended with a keen sense of character, place and political reality in the auspicious English, August.

"English, August" won the Special Jury Award at the 12th Torino Film Festival 1994. It won both the Silver Montgolfiere (Silver Grand Prix) and the Gilberto Martinez Solares prize for the Best First Film at the 16th Festival des 3 Continents, Nantes France, 1994

Later Films and Upcoming Projects

Split Wide Open (1999), another Hinglish film, was also a critical success and won a Special Jury Prize at the 2000 Singapore International Film Festival. Writing for The Hindu, Savitha Padmanabhan said: "Split Wide Open is a bold and strong statement on the filth and lawlessness that have wormed their way into the city of dreams, Mumbai". In an article for The Times of India, the film's lead actor Rahul Bose wrote: "Critics flayed me: After Split Wide Open was released, critics ripped apart my character. To be an English-speaking slum-dweller who is also a smuggler, I spent a month in slums and even shadowed a cocaine-dealer for two weeks. Ironically, the criticism at home turned into praise when I won the Best Actor award for Split Wide Open at the Singapore Film Festival."

Benegal's latest film, Road, Movie (2009), about a travelling cinema troupe in Rajasthan, and starring Abhay Deol and Tannishtha Chatterjee as the lead, premiered at the 2009 Toronto International Film Festival. In its review, The Hollywood Reporter wrote: "Dev Benegal's 'Road, Movie' takes you on a magical mystery tour into the heart of India and its robust cinema. It is, in fact, a road movie without the comma, but it is also about being on the road in a vast Indian landscape and about the phenomenon of touring cinemas that still exist in rural India. The film is specifically Indian, yet designed for wider appreciation in festivals and, if all goes well at the European Film Market, in cross-over releases in international territories."

His project Bombay Samourai was an official selection for the Hong Kong Asia Film Finance Forum (HAF) at the HongKong International Film Festival. This film is in development.

Dev Benegal is also developing a film on the life of mathematician Srinivasa Ramanujan.

Other works

24x7 Making Movies

In 2006, Benegal started a production program called 24×7 Making Movies, where he invited young people from all over India to come and make a film in 24 hours. The program has produced over 60 short feature films.

Screenwriting
Benegal is a long time advisor to eQuinoxe Screenwriting Workshops for Professionals. He has been invited by Under The Volcano, the international program of writing master classes to create and conduct a screenwriting master class for their 2020 program.

Themes and style 
Pritish Nandy while describing Benegal's films, said: "Dev Benegal spearheads the brat pack of movie directors who are all out to prove that indian movies is not all pelvis thrusting and running around trees."

An academic paper (Prateek, Prateek. (2013). "Popart": The 'global' avatar of bollywood. 5. 247-257) on Bollywood draws upon insights from his work and describes it as follows: "Benegal's cinematic dialogue with Indianness of English along with Englishness of India, with narratives of belonging, and with the compacted heterogeneity of urban-industrial India, established in his early cinema... Benegal understands the gravity of the national metaphor of 'unity in diversity', and tries to manifest it in the polyphony of various languages and different dialects – English, Hindi, and Telugu. Equally important are his 'artistic' story-telling skills, a trait usually found in the art cinema: the capacity to create credible characters (human or otherwise, like Dadru, the frog) and cultures, skilful scene-setting, mastery of pace and timing, and power of imagination."

Filmography

Screenplays

Documentaries

Awards

|-
|2014
|Dead, End (screenplay)
|Network of Asian Fantastic Films Prize
|
|Hong Kong International Film Festival
|-
|2011
|Road, Movie
|Best Sound for Vikram Joglekar
|
|17th Annual Star Screen Awards

|-
|2010
|Road, Movie
|Golden Duke Award
|
|Odessa International Film Festival
|-
|2009
|Road, Movie
|Tokyo Sakura Grand Prix Award
|
|Tokyo International Film Festival
|-
|2000
|Split Wide Open
|Special Jury Prize
|
|Singapore International Film Festival
|-
|2000
|Split Wide Open
|Silver Screen Award
|
|Singapore International Film Festival

|-
|2000
|Split Wide Open
|The Grand Prix
|
|Turnhout International Film Festival Belgium (Focus Op Het Zuiden)
|-
|2000
|Split Wide Open
|Grand Prix
|
|Bratislava International Film Festival
|-
|2000
|Split Wide Open
|Best Actor for Rahul Bose
|
|Singapore International Film Festival
|-
| 1995
|English, August
|Best Feature Film in English
|
|National Film Awards
|-
| 1994 
|English, August
|Silver Montgolfiere (Silver Grand Prix)
|
|Festival des 3 Continents
|-
| 1994 
|English, August
|Golden Montgolfiere (Golden Grand Prix)
|
|Festival des 3 Continents
|-
|1994
|English, August
|Gilberto Martinez Solares (Best First Film)
|
|Festival des 3 Continents
|-
|1994
|English, August
|Special Jury Award
|
|Torino International Film Festival
|-
|1994
|English, August
|Prize of the City of Torino
|
|Torino International Film Festival

|-
|1988
|Kalpavriksha
|Certificate of Merit
|
|Indian Documentary Producers Association Awards for Excellence
|-
|1987
|Anantarupam
|Special Jury Award
|
|Indian Documentary Producers Association Awards for Excellence
|-
|1987
|Anantarupam
|Best Cinematography
|
|Indian Documentary Producers Association Awards for Excellence

References

External links
Dev Benegal Weblog

1960 births
Living people
Film directors from Delhi
Hindi-language film directors
Indian male screenwriters
Indian documentary filmmakers
20th-century Indian film directors
21st-century Indian film directors